Pe Werner (born October 13, 1960 in Heidelberg) is a German singer.

Life 
Werner is a popular singer in Germany. She sings songs in German language.

Awards 
 1991 Preis der deutschen Schallplattenkritik
 1992 Echo
 1992 Fred-Jay-Award
 1992 RSH-Gold
 1993 Goldene Schallplatte for song Kribbeln im Bauch
 1994 RSH-Gold
 1995 Goldene Stimmgabel
 2002 Lale Andersen Award
 2011 Goldene Schallplatte for song Im Mondrausch

References

External links 

German women singers
1960 births
Living people
Musicians from Heidelberg
Echo (music award) winners